This Is 40 is a 2012 American realistic comedy film written and directed by Judd Apatow and starring Paul Rudd and Leslie Mann. A "sort-of sequel" to Apatow's 2007 film Knocked Up, the movie centers on married couple Pete (Rudd) and Debbie (Mann), characters introduced in the previous film, whose stressful relationship is compounded by each turning 40. John Lithgow, Megan Fox, and Albert Brooks appear in supporting roles.

Filming was conducted in mid-2011, and This Is 40 was released in North America on December 21, 2012. It received mixed reviews from critics, who praised its cast, acting (particularly Mann, Rudd and Fox) and the film's comedic moments and perceptive scenes, but criticized its overlong running time and occasional aimlessness. In March 2022, Apatow was announced to be in early development of a third film, set 10 years later and titled This Is 50.

Plot
In the five years since Knocked Up, Debbie owns a boutique and Desi and Jodi works for her. Pete owns his own record label, and friends Ronnie and Cat work with him.

Pete's business is struggling financially as he promotes the reunion of Graham Parker & The Rumour. The couple also are having to deal with their daughters; Thirteen-year-old Sadie and eight-year-old Charlotte. For Debbie's 40th birthday, the couple goes on a romantic weekend to a resort. There they get high on marijuana cookies and fantasize out loud about ways they would kill each other.

After speaking with her friends Jason and Barb, Debbie decides to improve her marriage and family through exercise and becoming more connected with her father. She tells Pete he needs to stop lending his dad Larry money because it is hurting them financially. Pete visits him, but is unsuccessful at giving him the news, and still agrees to give him more. Meanwhile, Debbie visits her gynecologist, discovering she is pregnant but decides not to tell Pete. Later, she yells at a student, Joseph, who has been taunting Sadie on Facebook. So much so that his mother, Catherine, gets into an argument with Pete.

One night between the school taunting sequences, Debbie takes Desi out dancing at a club, planning to confront her with her suspicions that she has been stealing money from the store. Debbie and Desi meet several players from the Philadelphia Flyers hockey team there. Debbie awkwardly finds out that one of the players wants to hang out with her and possibly sleep with her. Though flattered that he wants to have sex with her, she reveals that she is married, has two kids, and is pregnant. Afterward, Debbie drops Desi off at her house, finally confronting her about the missing money. Desi reveals she is able to afford nice things because she is also an escort.

Later, Debbie meets up with Jodi, who confesses she stole the money to buy Oxycontin. She fires her and leaves. Meanwhile, Pete and Debbie are having to deal with Sadie and Charlotte fighting all the time, resulting in arguments among the family. They later have to meet with the principal, but the couple denies everything Catherine accuses them of doing. The couple is delighted when she starts using the same foul language they had used previously, and the principal dismisses them.

At Pete's 40th birthday party, they argue about the money his dad wants from them. Debbie argues with her dad about not spending enough time in her life, and how he is perfect. Oliver then explains that his life is not perfect, and how he has always cared about her and loved her. Later, Pete overhears Debbie talking about her pregnancy, and rides out of the house on his bicycle in anger. Debbie and Larry go, finding he has cycled into a car door. Pete gets into an argument with the driver of the car, who then punches him in the stomach.

Debbie and Larry take Pete to the hospital, where Larry and Debbie reconcile, with Larry recognizing that she is why the family is able to stay together, as she is the fighter. Pete and Debbie talk later; he is actually thrilled about having a third baby, he doesn't feel trapped, so they reconcile.

Sometime later, Pete and Debbie are watching a small concert with Ryan Adams performing. She suggests he sign him to his label and they plan to talk to him as they finish watching the show.

After the main credits roll, there's an extended alternate take of Catherine's ad-libbing insults during the meeting with Debbie, Pete, and the school principal.

Cast

Cameos
 Scott Hartnell
 Ian Laperriere
 James van Riemsdyk
 Matt Carle

Release
This Is 40 was originally scheduled to be released on June 1, 2012. In May 2011, Universal postponed the release to December 2012, allowing the studio to use that date for their release of Snow White & the Huntsman; the Snow White film was seen as better competition with a rival 2012 Snow White film project, Mirror Mirror, by Relativity Media.

The premiere for This Is 40 was held on December 12, 2012 at the Grauman's Chinese Theatre, in Los Angeles. The film was released on December 21, 2012, opening in 2,912 locations nationwide.

Box office
During its opening weekend, This Is 40 grossed $11.58 million at the domestic box office.

By the end of its theatrical run, This Is 40 grossed approximately $67.5 million at the domestic box office, and approximately $20.5 million at the foreign box office, with a worldwide total of $88,058,786. While it had the lowest opening weekend for any of Apatow's films, it was a greater box-office success than his prior film, Funny People.

Critical reception
Rotten Tomatoes gives the film a 51% approval rating, based on reviews from 221 critics, with an average rating of 5.80/10. The website's critical consensus reads: "Judd Apatow definitely delivers funny and perceptive scenes in This Is 40, even if they are buried in aimless self-indulgence." On Metacritic, the film received a score of 59 out of 100, based on reviews from 39 critics, indicating "mixed or average reviews". Audiences polled by CinemaScore gave the film an average grade of "B–" on an A+ to F scale.

Robbie Collin of The Daily Telegraph gave the film two stars out of five, commending its premise but criticizing its execution. "This Is 40 is a comedy film about the hell of getting older in a place where aging naturally is the last taboo, and I only wish it lived up to that utterly inspired concept...every scene feels like an airbrushed composite of dozens of rambling takes, and 133 minutes is drainingly long for a story this sitcom-slight," he wrote.

Peter Travers of Rolling Stone gave the film three stars out of four, saying "There are big laughs here, and smaller ones that sting. Rudd and Mann are a joy to watch, especially when their comic darts draw blood, as when Debbie tells "charmboy" Pete that inside he's a dick. Cheers as well to a terrific supporting cast, including Melissa McCarthy as a mother from hell, John Lithgow as Debbie's withdrawn father, and the priceless Albert Brooks as Pete's dad, living off his son's dole to support his tow-headed triplets. This Is 40 doesn't build to a catharsis. It sometimes dawdles as it circles the spectacle of a marriage in flux. Yet Pete and Debbie's sparring yields some of Apatow's most personal observations yet on the feelings for husbands, wives, parents, and children that we categorize as love."

Michael Phillips of the Chicago Tribune said "More like This Is Whiny", giving the film two and a half stars out of four. "This Is 40 has its share of clever, zingy material, proving that writer-director Judd Apatow has lost none of his ability to land a punch line with the right, unexpected turn of phrase. 'My boobs are just ... gone,' bemoans Debbie, played by Leslie Mann, comparing hers with those of her employee, played by Megan Fox. Then comes the second line, building smartly on the setup: 'They didn't even say goodbye.' Mann is wonderful, a uniquely skillful comic and dramatic actor—wide-eyed yet merrily devastating when the venom's called for. Rudd can get away with murder on sheer charm. But it's easy, and sort of lazy, to establish jokes and entire scenes built upon mocking somebody's dialect, or the older daughter's obsession with Lost."

Richard Roeper gave the film a C- and called the film "a huge disappointment". His main complaint about the film was its running time and most of the unnecessary supporting characters.

The New Yorkers Richard Brody writes, This Is 40 "is the stuff of life, and it flows like life, and, like life, it would be good for it to last longer".

Accolades

Home media
This Is 40 was released for Blu-ray and DVD in the U.S. on March 22, 2013. It is available for digital download on iTunes, Google Play, and other websites. The Blu-ray version is being sold as a single disc, and also a combo pack, which includes a DVD copy, digital copy, and Ultraviolet. The disc features an unrated and also theatrical version of the film, as well as numerous bonus features.

Possible sequel

Director Judd Apatow stated he is interested in a possible sequel, shifting the focus off married couple Pete and Debbie and moving it onto their budding teenage daughter Sadie. During an interview on March 30, 2013, Apatow was questioned about the prospect of a sequel to This Is 40. He admitted to being intrigued by the idea.

In March 2022, it was reported Apatow was in early development of writing a script, with the film set 10 years after the previous, titled This is 50.

References

External links

 
 
 
 
 

2012 comedy-drama films
2012 films
American comedy-drama films
Apatow Productions films
Films about dysfunctional families
Films about marriage
Films directed by Judd Apatow
Films produced by Judd Apatow
Films produced by Barry Mendel
Films produced by Clayton Townsend
Films scored by Jon Brion
Films set in Los Angeles
Film spin-offs
Films with screenplays by Judd Apatow
Films about parenting
Midlife crisis films
Universal Pictures films
2010s English-language films
2010s American films